"What If I Do" is a song written by David Malloy, Ed Hill and Mark D. Sanders, and recorded by American country music artist Mindy McCready.  It was released on October 3, 1997 as the first single from Mindy's gold-selling second album If I Don't Stay the Night.   The song reached number 26 on the Billboard Hot Country Singles & Tracks chart.

Content
The song is in the key of D major with a moderate tempo and a vocal range of A3-D5. In it, the female narrator questions whether or not to pursue a further relationship with her date.

Critical reception
Dan Milliken of the blog Country Universe wrote that "McCready gives a fantastically entertaining performance, speak-singing her lines with a bold campiness that most other gals wouldn’t dare."

Chart performance
"What If I Do" debuted at number 59 on the U.S. Billboard Hot Country Singles & Tracks for the week of September 20, 1997.

References

1997 singles
Mindy McCready songs
Songs written by David Malloy
Songs written by Mark D. Sanders
Song recordings produced by David Malloy
BNA Records singles
Songs written by Ed Hill
1997 songs